A Happy Event is a 2011 French-Belgian comedy-drama film directed by Rémi Bezançon.

Plot
Barbara and Nicolas spin the perfect love. But there is one thing missing to their happiness: a child. One day, Barbara becomes pregnant and the birth of a baby girl will trouble her relationship with Nicolas and his family.

Cast 

 Louise Bourgoin - Barbara 
 Pio Marmaï - Nicolas 
 Josiane Balasko - Claire 
 Thierry Frémont - Tony 
 Gabrielle Lazure - Édith 
 Firmine Richard - Midwife 
 Lannick Gautry - Doctor Camille Rose
 Daphné Bürki - Katia
 Louis-Do de Lencquesaing - Jean-François Truffard
 Myriem Akheddiou - Nurse

References

External links 

French pregnancy films
Gaumont Film Company films
2011 comedy-drama films
2011 films
French comedy-drama films
Belgian comedy-drama films
Films directed by Rémi Bezançon
Films based on French novels
2010s pregnancy films
Belgian pregnancy films
2010s French films